Disconnected may refer to:

Film
 Disconnected (1984 film), an American psychological slasher film
 Disconnected (2021 film), a Hong Kong action drama film

Music

Albums
 Disconnected (The Buzzhorn album) or the title song, 2002
 Disconnected (Fates Warning album) or the title song, 2000
 Disconnected (Faust/Nurse with Wound album) or the title song, 2007
 Disconnected (Funkstörung album) or the title song, 2004
 Disconnected (Greymachine album), 2009
 Disconnected (Stiv Bators album), 1980
 Disconnected EP, by Profane Omen, or the title song, 2007
 Disconnected, by Beat Union, 2008
 Disconnected, by Chipzel, 2010
 Disconnected, by Dry Cell, 2002
 Disconnected, by the Dial-A-Poem Poets, 1974

Songs
 "Disconnected" (Face to Face song), 1993
 "Disconnected" (Keane song), 2012
 "Disconnected" (Queensrÿche song), 1994
 "Disconnected", by Idlewild from Warnings/Promises, 2005
 "Disconnected", by Inspector K from the music of the video game In the Groove
 "Disconnected", by Julian Lennon from Everything Changes, 2011
 "Disconnected", by Lindsay Lohan from Speak, 2004
 "Disconnected", by Rancid from Let the Dominoes Fall, 2009
 "Disconnected", by the Red Jumpsuit Apparatus, 2007
 "Disconnected", by Shy Child from Liquid Love, 2010
 "Disconnected", by Simple Minds from Cry, 2002
 "Disconnected (Out of Control)", by Trapt from Someone in Control, 2005

See also
 Disconnected graph, in graph theory
 Disconnected space, the opposite of connected space, in topology
 Disconnect (disambiguation)
 Disconnection (disambiguation)